This is a list of destinations served by Batavia Air.

Asia

East Asia
 China
Guangzhou - Guangzhou Baiyun International Airport
Hangzhou - Hangzhou Xiaoshan International Airport
 Hong Kong
 Hong Kong International Airport

Southeast Asia
 East Timor
Dili - Presidente Nicolau Lobato International Airport
 Indonesia
Ambon - Pattimura Airport
Balikpapan - Sultan Aji Muhammad Sulaiman Airport
Banda Aceh - Sultan Iskandarmuda Airport
Bandar Lampung - Radin Inten II Airport
Bandung - Husein Sastranegara International Airport
Banjarmasin - Syamsudin Noor Airport
Batam - Hang Nadim Airport
Bengkulu - Fatmawati Soekarno Airport
Berau - Berau Airport
Denpasar - Ngurah Rai International Airport
Gorontalo - Jalaluddin Airport
Jakarta - Soekarno-Hatta International Airport Hub
Jambi - Sultan Thaha Airport
Jayapura - Sentani Airport
Kendari - Wolter Monginsidi Airport
Kupang - El Tari Airport
Lombok - Lombok International Airport
Luwuk - Syukuran Aminuddin Amir Airport
Makassar - Hasanuddin International Airport
Malang - Abdul Rachman Saleh Airport
Manado - Sam Ratulangi Airport
Manokwari - Rendani Airport
Maumere - Wai Oti Airport
Medan - Polonia International Airport
Medan - Kuala Namu International Airport
Merauke - Mopah Airport
Padang - Minangkabau International Airport
Palangkaraya - Tjilik Riwut Airport
Palembang - Sultan Mahmud Badaruddin II Airport
Palu - Mutiara Airport
Pangkalpinang - Pangkal Pinang Airport
Pekanbaru - Sultan Syarif Qasim II International Airport
Pontianak - Supadio Airport
Semarang - Achmad Yani International Airport
Solo - Adisumarmo International Airport
Sorong - Sorong Airport
Surabaya - Juanda International Airport Hub
Tanjung Pandan - Buluh Tumbang Airport
Tanjung Pinang - Raja Haji Fisabilillah Airport
Tarakan - Juwata Airport
Ternate - Babullah Airport
Waingapu - Mau Hau Airport
Yogyakarta - Adisucipto International Airport
 Malaysia
Kuching - Kuching International Airport
 Singapore
Singapore Changi International Airport

West Asia
 Saudi Arabia
Jeddah - King Abdulaziz International Airport [seasonal]

References 

Batavia Air